Pseudobahia is a genus of California plants in the tribe Madieae within the family Asteraceae. These plants are known generally as sunbursts.

 Species
 Pseudobahia bahiifolia  (Benth.) Rydb. - Hartweg's golden sunburst (endangered)
 Pseudobahia heermannii (Durand) Rydb. - foothill sunburst
 Pseudobahia peirsonii Munz - San Joaquin adobe sunburst (threatened)

References

External links
 Jepson Manual Treatment
 USDA Plants Profile
 Flora of North America

Madieae
Endemic flora of California
Natural history of the California chaparral and woodlands
Asteraceae genera